The Samuelsen Høj Formation is a geologic formation in Greenland. It preserves fossils dating back to the Silurian period.

See also

 List of fossiliferous stratigraphic units in Greenland

References
 

Silurian Greenland
Silurian northern paleotropical deposits